Eodesmatodon was an early herbivorous mammal that was part of the Aegialodontidae family.

References

Prehistoric mammal genera